South Yarra Province was an electorate of the Victorian Legislative Council 
from November 1882 until May 1904.

South Yarra Province was created in the redistribution of provinces in 1882 when the Central and Eastern Provinces were abolished. The new South Yarra, North Yarra, North Central, South Eastern and Melbourne Provinces were then created.

The Legislative Council Act, 1881, created and defined the South Yarra Province as: 

South Yarra Province was abolished in another redistribution of Provinces in 1904; new provinces including East Yarra, Melbourne East Province, Melbourne North Province, Melbourne South Province and Melbourne West Provinces  were created.

Members for South Yarra Province
These were members of the upper house province of the Victorian Legislative Council. Three initially, four from the expansion of the Council in 1889.

 = by-election
 = resigned

References

Former electoral provinces of Victoria (Australia)
1882 establishments in Australia
1904 disestablishments in Australia